Sister Gerard Fernandez (born 1938) is a Roman Catholic nun who is best known for her work as a death row counsellor in Singapore.

In her more than 40 years of work, she worked with 18 inmates on death row, the most notable of which were Catherine Tan Mui Choo and Hoe Kah Hong, the women accomplices of Adrian Lim in the murders of 2 children.

Career
Her call to such work started one morning during enunciation drills when her father made her recite a verse "And I commit you to Sing Sing Prison, there to be hanged, drawn and quartered." She joined the Good Shepherd Sisters, a Roman Catholic order of nuns at 18, and started her work with her first death row inmate at 36.

Media
In 2018, she was featured in the short film Sister by film-maker Chai Yee Wei. The film highlighted Sister Gerard and her counseling of Catherine Tan Mui Choo and Hoe Kah Hong before their deaths.

Awards
She is the first Singaporean woman to be included in BBC's 2019 list of the 100 Women, the most inspiring women across the globe.

References 

Singaporean Roman Catholic religious sisters and nuns
Living people
1938 births
BBC 100 Women
20th-century Roman Catholic nuns
21st-century Roman Catholic nuns